Arica earthquake
 1604 Arica earthquake
 1615 Arica earthquake
 1868 Arica earthquake